Jeff Ballard  may refer to:

 Jeff Ballard (artist) (born 1977), American glass artist
 Jeff Ballard (baseball) (born 1963), former Major League baseball player
 Jeff Ballard (musician) (born 1963), American jazz drummer

See also
 Geoffrey Ballard (1932–2008), Canadian geophysicist and businessman